Nanded is a city in Maharashtra state, India. It is the tenth largest city in the state and the seventy-ninth most populous city in India. It is the second largest city in Marathwada region. It is the district headquarters of Nanded district.

The last Sikh Guru, Guru Gobind Singh spent his last days in Nanded and passed his guruship to the sacred text Guru Granth Sahib before his death there in 1708.

Location
Nanded is located on the banks of river Godavari in west-central India. Nanded district borders Latur district, Parbhani district and Hingoli district to the west and Yavatmal district to the north. The district is bordered by the Nizamabad, Kamareddy, Nirmal and Adilabad districts of Telangana state to the east and Bidar district of Karnataka state to the south.

Nanded has two parts: Old Nanded  occupies the north bank of the Godavari river; New Nanded, to the south of the river,  encompasses Waghala and neighbourhoods.

Etymology
Folklore suggests that the name "Nanded" developed from  the Vahana of Shiva. Shiva was said to have performed penance on the banks of the Godavari river. This "" later became "Nanded".

History

Nanded is mentioned in Mahabharata as place of Bharat's maternal grandparents. In the 1st century CE, power in the area lay with the Andhrabhrtyas and Satvahanas. In the 5th and 4th centuries BCE, Nanded was ruled by the Nanda dynasty. In the 3rd century BCE (about 272 to 231 BCE), it was part of the Maurya Empire under Ashoka. Local irrigation practices and Nanded itself are recorded in the treatise, Leela Charitra (late 1200s CE). Nanded was the birthplace of three Marathi poet-saints—Vishnupant Shesa, Raghunath Shesa, and Vaman Pandit Construction of Kandhar Fort, located in Kandhar, is attributed to the Rashtrakuta king Krishna III of Malkheda who ruled around 10th century CE.

From 1636, Nanded was the centre of governance of Nizam State, which includes present-day Telangana and Karnataka, and was an imperial province of the Mughal Badshah (emperor) Shah Jahan. In 1657, Nanded merged into Bidah Subah. Guru Nanak (1469  1539 CE) passed through Nanded on his way to Sri Lanka. Guru Gobind Singh (1666  1708 CE) arrived in Nanded with the Mughal emperor Bahadur Shah I (1643  1712 CE) near the end of August in 1707 CE. When Bahadur Shah moved on to Golconda, Guru Gobind Singh remained in Nanded. Guru Gobind Singh proclaimed he was the last (tenth) living guru and established the sacred text, the Guru Granth Sahib as an eternal "living" leader. Guru Gobind Singh died without a lineal descendant due to the martyrdom of his four sons.

In 1725, Nanded became part of Hyderabad State. In about 1835, Maharaja Ranjit Singh commissioned the construction of a gurdwara at Nanded with the financial aid of Sikander Jah (3rd Nizam of hyderabad) It was built on the site of Guru Gobind Singh's cremation. The gurdwara is part of the Hazur Sahib.

After India gained independence in 1947, the Indian Armed Forces annexed Hyderabad and ended the rule of the Nizam in Operation Polo, making Nanded part of the new Hyderabad State. Nanded remained part of the Hyderabad state until 1956 when it was included in the Bombay Presidency.

On 1 May 1960, Maharashtra state was created on a linguistic basis and the Marathi dominant Nanded district became part of Maharashtra. In December 2022, 25 Nanded district villages renewed their demand to merge with Telangana.

Geography
Nanded is built on the Deccan Traps lava flows of the upper cretaceous to lower eocene eras. The lava flows are overlain by thin alluvial deposits. The lava flows are horizontal and each flow has two distinct units. The highly weathered vesicular trap and underlying weathered jointed and fractured massive trap constitutes the main water-yielding zones. The soil is mostly formed from igneous rocks and are black, medium black, shallow and calcareous types having different depths and profiles. Godavari river passes through the city.

Climate

Demographics
 2011 census, Nanded had a population of 550,564. The municipality had a gender ratio of 924 females per 1,000 males. 12.4 percent of the population were under six years old. Effective literacy was 87.40 percent. 81.74 percent of women were literate. Male literacy was 92.68 percent.

Transport

Road
Nanded lies on NH 61 (Kalyan–Ahmednagar–Parbhani–Nanded–Nirmal), NH 361 (Nagpur–Wardha-Yavatmal–Nanded-Latur–Solapur–Sangli–Kolhapur–Ratnagiri) and NH 161 (Akola–Washim–Hingoli–Nanded–Degloor–Sangareddy). MSRTC buses connect Nanded to many cities of the Maharashtra state. TSRTC buses connect Nanded to some cities of the Telangana state.

Rail

Hazur Sahib Nanded railway station is located on the Secunderabad–Manmad line of Nanded railway division of the South Central Railway Zone (SCR). Nanded railway division is one of the six railway divisions under South Central Railway zone of Indian Railways. Around 48 trains arrive and depart each day from this station. Maltekdi railway station is another railway station serving city of Nanded.

Air
The Shri Guru Gobind Singh Ji Airport, Nanded is served by daily TruJet flights to Hyderabad, Mumbai and Jalgaon. Air India operates flights to Amritsar.

Economy
Crops grown around Nanded include cotton, bananas, sugarcane, mangoes, soya beans, sweet limes, Grapes, Papaya, and sorghum (jawar). Nanded has a Regional Cotton Research Center to support the Cotton-growing industry. There is an agricultural school operational under the aegis of Krishi Vidyapeeth of Parbhani.

Tourism is supported by 10 million annual visitors who are mostly religious pilgrims.

Education

On 17 September 1994, the Swami Ramanand Teerth Marathwada University (SRTMU) was established in Nanded after a restructuring of the Marathwada University in Aurangabad. The university supervises the educational activities in senior colleges in four districts of Marathwada division.

Notable educational institutions in Nanded include the Dr. Shankarrao Chavan Government Medical College and Shri Guru Gobind Singhji Institute of Engineering and Technology.

Governance
The city of Nanded is managed by the Nanded-Waghala Municipal Corporation (NWCMC). The corporation consists of 81 democratically elected members. The Municipal Commissioner is the Chief Executive of the corporation. Sunil Lahane is the current Chief Executive of the corporation.

Tourism

Nanded fort
Nanded Fort, also known as Nandgiri Fort is a fort located on the banks of Godavari river. The Godavari river encloses the fort on three sides. The fort has been converted into a garden to attract tourists. There is a water tank constructed in the fort.

Mandir

The Vedic rituals are regularly performed on the ghats of Godavari River which include Urvashi Ghat, Ram Ghat, and Govardhan Ghat.

 Kaleshwar Mandir, Vishnupuri 
 Shani Mandir, Mondha
 Yagyavalkya Vedpathshala Saraswati Mandir, Shree Nagar
 Shri Yadav Ahir Samaj Mahamai Mata Mandir, Devinagar 
 Ganpati Mandir, Trikut
 Hanuman Mandir, Trikut
 Datta Mandir, Trikut 
 Rajput Sangh Renuka Mata Mandir, Mahurgarh
 Siddheshwar Mandir, Hottal  built during the Chalukya era, an example of Hemadpanti temple architecture.
 Shiva Mandir, Tadkhel, Degloor Taluka  built with large stones displaying scripture by the Hindu king, Senapati.
 Jagdamba Mata Mandir, Tadkhel
 Shri Narsinh Mandir, Junna Kautha.

Gurdwara

 Hazur Sahib was built by Maharaja Ranjit Singh. It is one of the Panj Takht, the five seats of higher authority for Sikhs. It is built at the site of cremation of Guru Gobind Singh. His remains and weapons are preserved at the site.
 Gurdwara Nagina Ghat Sahib
 Gurdwara Banda Ghat Sahib (Baba Banda Singh Bahadur)
 Gurdwara Shikaar Ghat Sahib
 Gurdwara Baoli Sahib
 Gurdwara Heera Ghat
 Gurdwara Mata Sahib
 Gurdwara Maal Tekdi
 Gurdwara Sangat Sahib
 Gurdwara Nanakpuri Sahib (place of Guru Nanak)
 Gurdwara Bhajangarh Sahib

Church

 St. Francis De Sales Catholic Church
 Methodist Church
 Bethel AG Church
 The Pentecostal Mission (Church)
 Bethesda Ministries Church

Notable people

 Banda Singh Bahadur, a Sikh military commander.
 Datta Bhagat, an Ambedkarite author.
 Ashok Chavan, former Chief Minister of Maharashtra state and former Member of Parliament of the Nanded Loksabha constituency.
 Shankarrao Chavan, the former Chief minister and former Home minister of Maharashtra state.
 Prataprao Govindrao Chikhalikar, current Member of Parliament and former MLA
 Syed Sadatullah Husaini,  president (Amir) of Jamaat-e-Islami Hind (JIH).
 Kamalkishor Kadam, a former minister of education.
 Nagnath Lalujirao Kottapalle, former Vice-chancellor of BAMU, an educationalist and an author.
 Narhar Ambadas Kurundkar, a scholar, critic and author.
 Vaman Pandit, a Marathi scholar and a poet.
 Guru Gobind Singh, the last Sikh Guru who died in Nanded.

See also
Marathwada

References

	

 
Hyderabad State
Cities and towns in Nanded district
Nanded district
Talukas in Maharashtra